Decarthria stephensii is a species of beetle in the family Cerambycidae. It was described by Hope in 1834. It is known from Guadeloupe and Saint Vincent and the Grenadines.

References

Cyrtinini
Beetles described in 1834